The Thin Man is a series of popular films featuring detective characters Nick and Nora Charles, of which the first was based on the novel of the same name by Dashiell Hammett.

Films

American film series